Withering Tights is the first in a series of books written by Louise Rennison called The Misadventures Of Tallulah Casey. The books are published HarperCollins.

Published in July 2010 in the United Kingdom, this book was awarded a Roald Dahl 'funny' prize.

Plot

Tallulah Casey, a lanky girl worried about her knees and underdeveloped cleavage, is off to stay at a drama performance workshop centre in Yorkshire called Dother Hall. There she meets the Tree Sisters (Flossie, Vaisey, Honey and Jo). Together they all go through boys, snogging and bad acting. Will Tallulah stay for another term? Will she get the boy of her dreams? And will it be Alex, the older brother of her friend Ruby, Charlie, the perfect guy who loves her knobbly knees, despite the fact he has a girlfriend, or evil Cain, lead singer of the local band, who doesn't seem to realise that Tallulah's nose is not an ice cream?

References

External links
 Author web page

British young adult novels
2010 British novels
HarperCollins books